Morag may refer to:

Fiction
 Morag Bellingham, a character on Home and Away
 Mòrag Ladair, a character from the video game Xenoblade Chronicles 2
 Morag the Tulgah Witch, a character on the animated series Ewoks
 Morag, a character in the Star Trek: The Next Generation episode "Aquiel"
 Morag, a fictional planet in the Marvel Cinematic Universe that appeared in the films Guardians of the Galaxy (2014) and Avengers: Endgame (2019)

People with the given name
 Morag Shepherd, Scottish playwright
 Morag McLellan, Scottish field hockey player
 Morag McLaren, Scottish singer
 Morag Beaton, Scottish-Australian soprano

Other uses
 Morąg, a city in Poland
 Morag, a monster reported to inhabit Loch Morar in Scotland
 Morag, a former Israeli settlement in Gush Katif
 Megan and Morag, sheep that were the first mammals to be cloned from differentiated cells
 Sherman Morag, the Israeli name for the Sherman Crab tank; see 
 Mòrag, a Scottish female given name, sometimes translated as Sarah.